Gerald Balding may refer to:

Gerald Barnard Balding Sr. (1909–1957), British polo player
Toby Balding (Gerald Barnard Balding Jr., 1936–2014), British racehorse trainer, his son